Benton Township is a township in Lake County, Illinois, United States, and includes all of the village of Winthrop Harbor, most of the village of Beach Park, and small portions of the cities of Zion and Waukegan.  As of the 2010 census, its population was 18,951.  Zion Township was formed from Benton Township on September 12, 1930.

Geography
Lakes in this township include Sand Pond. The streams of Bull Creek and Dead River run through this township.

Cities and towns
 Beach Park
 Winthrop Harbor

Adjacent townships
 Pleasant Prairie Township (north)
 Bristol Township (northwest)
 Zion Township (center)
 Newport Township (west)
 Waukegan Township (south)
 Warren Township (southwest)

Cemeteries
The township contains nine cemeteries: Benton Greenwood, Briggs Family, Buffalo Grove Catholic, Catholic, Colchester, County Line, Cranberry Lake, Pineview and Rosecrans.

Major highways
 Illinois Route 137

Airports and landing strips
 Waukegan Regional Airport

Demographics

References
 U.S. Board on Geographic Names (GNIS)
 United States Census Bureau cartographic boundary files

External links
 Benton Township official website
 US-Counties.com
 City-Data.com
 US Census
 Illinois State Archives

Townships in Lake County, Illinois
Townships in Illinois